Lapworth railway station serves the village of Kingswood, Warwickshire, near the village of Lapworth from which it takes its name. It has two platforms connected by a footbridge. Most trains are those provided by Chiltern on its London Marylebone/Leamington Spa/Birmingham Snow Hill/Kidderminster route, but these are augmented by a few West Midlands Trains services.

History
The station was opened by the Great Western Railway in 1854. It was known as Kingswood until 1 May 1902 when the name was changed to Lapworth to avoid confusion with the station of the same name in Surrey. From 1894, Lapworth was the starting point of a short lived branch line to Henley-in-Arden. The branch was closed as an economy measure during the First World War in 1915, and never reopened.

A footbridge spans the remaining two tracks, and continues to the west of the northbound platform spanning where quadruple tracks once existed. For a brief period prior to the lifting of the quadruple tracks there was a DMU service along what had been the GWR's Paddington - Birkenhead main line. It plied between Wellington (Shropshire) and Lapworth stopping at all the intermediate stations and linking them with Wolverhampton Low Level and Birmingham Snow Hill.

The station is unstaffed; ticketing is restricted to a 'Permit-to-Travel' machine located at the main entrance to the station (off Station Lane) at the north end of the London-bound (southbound) platform. The station can also be accessed via a footpath from Mill Lane.

Accidents and incidents
On 30 November 1948, locomotive 4150 was running round its train when it was in collision with a passenger train hauled by 5022 Wigmore Castle, which had overrun signals. Eight passengers were injured.

Services

The station has a basic two-hourly service in each direction in the current timetable, provided by the Chiltern Railways Leamington Spa to Birmingham Moor Street service. In peak hours this is augmented by some additional West Midlands Trains services to/from Leamington, giving through links to Stourbridge Junction and Kidderminster, and during weekdays two trains a day go to Stratford-upon-Avon. On Sundays a two-hourly service operates, but with through services to and from London Marylebone.

References

External links

Historical photographs of Lapworth station at warwickshirerailways.com
Rail Around Birmingham and the West Midlands: Lapworth station

Railway stations in Warwickshire
DfT Category F1 stations
Former Great Western Railway stations
Railway stations in Great Britain opened in 1854
Railway stations served by Chiltern Railways
Railway stations served by West Midlands Trains